Emil Steinberger (born 6 January 1933) is a Swiss comedian, writer, director and actor. 

He was born in Luzern. He is well known as Emil in Switzerland and Germany for his acts on television in the 1970s and 1980s. 

In 2022, Steinberger received the Lifetime Award at the Swiss Comedy Awards.

References

External links 
 
 
 

Swiss comedians
Kabarettists
People from Lucerne
1933 births
Living people